The 1992 All-Ireland Under-21 Hurling Championship final was a hurling match played on 13 September 1992 to determine the winners of the 1992 All-Ireland Under-21 Hurling Championship, the 29th season of the All-Ireland Under-21 Hurling Championship, a tournament organised by the Gaelic Athletic Association for the champion teams of the four provinces of Ireland. The final was contested by Waterford of Munster and Offaly of Leinster, with the game ending in a 4-4 to 0-16 draw. The replay took place on 27 September 1992, with Waterford winning by 0-12 to 2-3.

Details

Drawn match

Replay

References

1992 in hurling
All-Ireland Under-21 Hurling Championship Finals
Waterford GAA matches
Offaly GAA matches